is the fourth studio album by French dance-pop band Yelle. It was released on 4 September 2020 by Recreation Center, the record label founded by the band. It is the band's first album since the release of Complètement fou six years prior.

Background
Yelle began writing L'Ère du Verseau in the spring of 2019. The band was in Montreal to record a song with Billboard, a music producer who previously collaborated with the band on Complètement fou. The album was completed just before the COVID-19 pandemic placed France in lockdown.

Track listing

Charts

References

External links
 Yelle official site

2020 albums
Yelle albums